MS Olau Hollandia has been the name of two Olau Line cruiseferries:

 , in service 1981–1989
 , in service 1989–1994

Ship names